Skiff is an end-to-end encrypted email service and collaboration tool. It launched in 2021 and was developed in San Francisco, California.

History 
Skiff was founded by Andrew Milich and Jason Ginsberg in 2020 and was initially focused on providing a secure document editing service similar to Google Docs. While Skiff was in beta, the founders released a public whitepaper explaining how Skiff’s encryption works. Skiff had its public launch out of beta in November 2021. A difference from other services was that it stored its files using the InterPlanetary File System (IPFS). 

Skiff Mail and Skiff Drive were launched in 2022.

Software 
Most of Skiff’s code is open source. Skiff uses public-key authenticated encryption for secure and private access to end-to-end encrypted documents, files and emails. Skiff also allows users to send payments through MetaMask.

References 

2022 software